Nougat de Montélimar is a confection speciality produced in Montélimar in the department of Drôme in France.

History

Middle East
The early recipes of white nougat are found in a Middle Eastern book in Baghdad the 10th century. That nougat was called ناطف nāṭif. One of these recipes indicates that the nāṭif comes from Harran, a city located between Urfa (now in southeast Turkey) and Aleppo, Syria. Mention of nāṭif was found in a triangle between Urfa, Aleppo, and Baghdad. At the end of the 10th century, the traveler and geographer Ibn Hawqal wrote that he ate some nāṭif in Manbij (in modern Syria) and Bukhara (in modern Uzbekistan).

Andalucia
Then recipes of white nougat are attested in Arab Andalusia in the 13th century, then in Catalonia in the 14th century, where it is called toron or pinyonada. In Italy, the torrone is the heir to the spanish nougat. In 1555, Nostradamus gave a recipe for rock pignolate, which came from Italy. Despite its name in reference to pine nuts, it is a recipe similar to the recipes for white nougat with almonds. This recipe was adopted in 1600 by Olivier de Serres, an agronomist living in Ardèche.

France
Legend has it that Olivier de Serres had almond trees planted in the region near Montélimar to make nougat, but almond trees had been cultivated in Provence since at least the 14th and 15th centuries and between 1474 and the middle of the 16th century, the Lyon fairs already marketed almonds from Drôme and Ardèche.

The word nogat (from nux, walnuts, which became nuca in popular Latin, then noga in old Provençal), which became nougat at the beginning of the 19th century, was certified in 1607 in the Thresor de santé, a book on dietetics, to designate a confectionery from Provence and Languedoc.

Montélimar 

The Montélimar nougat is composed of almonds, honey, and a light mousse of egg whites. The latter lightens the dough and gives it its traditional whitish color. Traditionally, nougat was baked at home, not by skilled nougat makers (in French nougatiers).

In 1701, when they were coming back from Spain on horseback, Louis, Duke of Bourgogne, and Charles, Duke of Berry stopped in Montélimar. The inhabitants offered them one quintal of Nougat (equivalent to ). The sweet's reputation spread from this point.

The success of Montélimar nougat is mainly due to Montélimar's mayor, Émile Loubet, who was later elected President of France (1899–1906). During this period, he undertook a huge campaign promoting the nougat. He offered it to all crowned royalty in France, as well as to foreign Presidents coming to the Élysée Palace. Through these efforts, the reputation of nougat became international.

In 1968 the A7 autoroute was built and the Nougatiers took advantage of this opportunity. They set up shop in the Montélimar rest area, which is the largest in Europe, and sold their nougat to travellers passing by.

In 1993 the Nougatiers Fedaration applied for Nougat de Montélimar to be designated a Protected Geographical Indication (PGI). The application was granted in February 2003.

In Montélimar, there are still dozens of Nougatiers. The annual production is around 4,500 tons, and the Nougat industry employs about 300 workers.

Trivia
The "Montélimar" is famously cited among a variety of candy flavours in the Beatles' song "Savoy Truffle", written by George Harrison and taken from their 1968 album The Beatles (also known as "the White Album").

Sources

References

French confectionery
Montélimar